Yelokh is a rural locality (a village) in Krasnoselskoye Rural Settlement, Yuryev-Polsky District, Vladimir Oblast, Russia. The population was 15 as of 2010.

Geography 
Yelokh is located on the Koloksha River, 14 km west of Yuryev-Polsky (the district's administrative centre) by road. Frolovskoye is the nearest rural locality.

References 

Rural localities in Yuryev-Polsky District